Kapuvár is a district in central-western part of Győr-Moson-Sopron County. Kapuvár is also the name of the town where the district seat is found. The district is located in the Western Transdanubia Statistical Region.

Geography 
Kapuvár District borders with the Austrian state of Burgenland to the north, Mosonmagyaróvár District and Csorna District to the east, Celldömölk District and Sárvár District (Vas County) to the south, Sopron District to the west. The number of the inhabited places in Kapuvár District is 19.

Municipalities 
The district has 2 towns and 17 villages.
(ordered by population, as of 1 January 2012)

The bolded municipalities are cities.

Demographics

In 2011, it had a population of 23,778 and the population density was 64/km².

Ethnicity
Besides the Hungarian majority, the main minorities are the Roma and German (approx. 300-300).

Total population (2011 census): 23,778
Ethnic groups (2011 census): Identified themselves: 21,806 persons:
Hungarians: 21,030 (96.44%)
Gypsies: 318 (1.46%)
Germans: 297 (1.36%)
Others and indefinable: 161 (0.74%)
Approx. 2,000 persons in Kapuvár District did not declare their ethnic group at the 2011 census.

Religion
Religious adherence in the county according to 2011 census:

Catholic – 16,983 (Roman Catholic – 16,948; Greek Catholic – 31);
Evangelical – 1,298; 
Reformed – 253;
other religions – 157; 
Non-religious – 546; 
Atheism – 101;
Undeclared – 4,440.

See also
List of cities and towns in Hungary

References

External links
 Postal codes of the Kapuvár District

Districts in Győr-Moson-Sopron County